Tony Thomas (July 31, 1927 – July 8, 1997) was a British-American film historian, author, writer, producer, and radio and television broadcaster. Considered one of Hollywood's preeminent film historians, he authored over thirty books, produced more than fifty albums of film music, and produced film documentaries for radio and television. Among his works are biographies of Errol Flynn, Burt Lancaster, Joel McCrea, Gregory Peck, and Dick Powell, and entries in Citadel Press's Films of series, including chronicles of the careers of Marlon Brando, Henry Fonda, Olivia de Havilland, Gene Kelly, Ronald Reagan, and James Stewart.

Biography 
Anthony William George Thomas was born on July 31, 1927, near Portsmouth, England, the son of a bandmaster in the Royal Marines. At the age of eighteen, he moved to Canada, where he became an announcer for the Canadian Broadcasting Corporation in 1948. He went on to become a writer and producer of programs about Hollywood and the film industry for CBC Radio. He was also the writer and host of the CBS television series As Time Goes By and was a panelist on the quiz show television series Flashback.

In 1966, Thomas moved to Los Angeles and began a new career as a film historian and author. He wrote books on actors' careers, such as The Films of Errol Flynn (1969, with Rudy Behlmer and Clifford McCarty), The Films of Kirk Douglas (1972), The Films of Marlon Brando (1973), The Films of Gene Kelly (1974), The Great Adventure Films (1976), The Films of Ronald Reagan (1980), The Films of Olivia de Havilland (1983), and A Wonderful Life: The Films and Career of James Stewart (1988). He also wrote books on film genres, such as The Great Adventure Films (1976), The Cinema of the Sea: A Critical Survey and Filmography, 1925–1986 (1988), and The West that Never Was (1989), as well as books on the major film studios, including The Films of 20th Century-Fox: A Pictorial History (1979), The Films of 20th Century-Fox: A Pictorial History (1985), and The Best of Universal (1990).

Thomas was one of the founders of The Film Music Society and served on its advisory board for many years. Considered an expert on film  music, he produced albums of classic film scores and wrote the well-received book Music for the Movies (1973), an introduction to important film composers. From 1979 to 1984, he wrote for the Academy Awards shows, and beginning in the late 1970s, was a segment producer for the Oscars. As an independent film writer and producer, he produced three PBSdocumentaries: Hollywood and the American Image, Back to the Stage Door Canteen, and The West That Never Was. His distinguished voice was heard for years as the announcer on the televised Kennedy Center Honors and American Film Institute Salutes.

Thomas's later books include Errol Flynn: The Spy Who Never Was (1990), The Films of Henry Fonda (1990), Joel McCrea: Riding the High Country (1991), and The Dick Powell Story (1992). Thomas died on July 8, 1997 at Providence Saint Joseph Medical Center in Burbank, California of complications from pneumonia, at the age of sixty-nine. He was survived by his son, David, his daughter, Andrea, and his companion, Lorna Grenadier. He is considered one of Hollywood's preeminent film historians.

Works 

 The Films of Errol Flynn (1969), with Rudy Behlmer and Clifford McCarty
 Ustinov in Focus (1971)
 The Films of Kirk Douglas (1972)
 Cads and Cavaliers: The Gentlemen Adventurers of the Movies (1973)
 Music for the Movies (1973)
 The Busby Berkeley Book (1973)
 The Films of Marlon Brando (1973)
 The Films of Gene Kelly (1974)
 The Films of the Forties (1975)
 Hollywood's Hollywood: The Movies About the Movies (1975), with Rudy Behlmer
 Harry Warren and the Hollywood Musical (1975)
 Burt Lancaster (1975)
 The Great Adventure Films (1976)
 Gregory Peck (1977)
 Film Score: The View from the Podium (1979)
 Film Score: The Art and Craft of Movie Music (1979)
 The Films of 20th Century-Fox: A Pictorial History (1979)
 The Films of Ronald Reagan (1980)
 From a Life of Adventure: The Writings of Errol Flynn (1980)
 Hollywood and the American Image (1981)
 The Films of Olivia de Havilland (1983)
 That's Dancing! (1984)
 Howard Hughes in Hollywood (1985)
 The Films of 20th Century-Fox: A Pictorial History (1985)
 Ronald Reagan Hollywood Years (1986)
 George Gershwin Remembered (1987)
 A Wonderful Life: The Films and Career of James Stewart (1988)
 The Cinema of the Sea: A Critical Survey and Filmography, 1925–1986 (1988)
 The West that Never Was (1989)
 Errol Flynn: The Spy Who Never Was (1990)
 The Films of Henry Fonda (1990)
 The Best of Universal (1990)
 Joel McCrea: Riding the High Country (1991)
 The Dick Powell Story (1992)

References

External links 
 

1927 births
1997 deaths
American film historians
British film historians
Writers from Portsmouth
Mass media people from Portsmouth